Alain Decaux (23 July 1925 − 27 March 2016) was a French historian. He was elected to the Académie française on 15 February 1979.

In 2005, he was, with others authors as Frédéric Beigbeder, Mohamed Kacimi, Richard Millet and Jean-Pierre Thiollet, among the Beirut Book Fair's main guests in the Beirut International Exhibition & Leisure Center, commonly (BIEL).

Bibliography

 1947    (Librairie académique Perrin)
 1949    (Librairie académique Perrin)
 1951   (in collaboration with André Castelot, J.-C. Simard, and J.-F. Chiappe)
 1952    (Librairie académique Perrin)
 1952    (Librairie académique Perrin)
 1953    (Librairie académique Perrin)
 1954    (Librairie académique Perrin)
 1954    (Librairie académique Perrin)
 1956-1957   (in collaboration with Stellio Lorenzi and André Castelot)
 1957    (Librairie académique Perrin)
 1957-1966   (in collaboration with Stellio Lorenzi and André Castelot)
 1958    (Librairie académique Perrin)
 1958    (Librairie académique Perrin)
 1960    (Librairie académique Perrin)
 1961   (in collaboration with J.-F. Chiappe)
 1962   (in collaboration with A. Castelot and J.-F. Chiappe)
 1962   (réalisation de Stellio Lorenzi)
 1963   (Grand prix du disque)
 1964    (Librairie académique Perrin)
 1964    (Librairie académique Perrin)
 1964   (Grand prix du disque)
 1966    (Librairie académique Perrin)
 1966    (Librairie académique Perrin)
 1967    (Librairie académique Perrin)
 1967   (réalisation de Robert Hossein)
 1968    (Librairie académique Perrin)
 1968  
 1968    (Librairie académique Perrin)
 1969   (in collaboration with André Castelot and Général Kœnig).  (Librairie académique Perrin)
 1969-1981  
 1971    (Librairie académique Perrin)
 1972    (Librairie académique Perrin)
 1975   (in collaboration with R. Hossein and G. Soria)
 1975-1976   (œuvre radiophonique)
 1976    (Librairie académique Perrin)
 1976-1977  , (8 vol. in collaboration with André Castelot, Jacques Levron and Marcel Jullian)  (Librairie académique Perrin)
 1977    (Librairie académique Perrin)
 1978    (Librairie académique Perrin)
 1978   (in collaboration with Robert Hossein and G. Soria)
 1979   (in collaboration with S. Lorenzi and G. Soria)
 1979    (Librairie académique Perrin)
 1980    (Librairie académique Perrin)
 1981    (Librairie académique Perrin)
 1981-1985  
 1982  Les Misérables, d'après Victor Hugo (screenplay, directed by Robert Hossein)
 1982    (Librairie académique Perrin)
 1983    (Librairie académique Perrin)
 1983  
 1984    (Librairie académique Perrin)
 1985  
 1985-1987  
 1986    (Librairie académique Perrin)
 1987    (Librairie académique Perrin)
 1987   (in collaboration with R. Hossein)
 1987    (Librairie académique Perrin)
 1987-1988  
 1988   (in collaboration with S. Lorenzi and G. Soria)
 1988    (Librairie académique Perrin)
 1991    (Librairie académique Perrin)
 1991  
 1992    (Librairie académique Perrin)
 1993    (Librairie académique Perrin)
 1993   (in collaboration with A. Castelot)
 1993    (Librairie académique Perrin)
 1994  
 1994    (Librairie académique Perrin)
 1995    (Librairie académique Perrin)
 1996    (Librairie académique Perrin)
 1996    (Librairie académique Perrin)
 1997    (Librairie académique Perrin)
 1997    (Librairie académique Perrin)
 1998    (Librairie académique Perrin)
 1999   (in collaboration with Alain Peyrefitte)
 1999    (Librairie académique Perrin)
 2000    (Librairie académique Perrin)
 2002    (Perrin)
 2002  
 2005    (Perrin)
 2007    (Perrin)

References

External links
 L'Académie française 

1925 births
2016 deaths
Writers from Lille
20th-century French historians
Members of the Académie Française
Grand Officiers of the Légion d'honneur
Lycée Janson-de-Sailly alumni
French male non-fiction writers